Eduardo Baltazar Gadiano (born April 1, 1963) is a Filipino politician who is the incumbent Governor of Occidental Mindoro since 2019.

Career

Sablayan
Gadiano was also the former Mayor of Sablayan from 2010 to 2019. He also served three full terms as vice mayor prior to becoming the chief executive of the town. As presiding Officer of the Sangguniang Bayan of Sablayan, he was responsible for instating a 25-year moratorium on large scale mining. Despite of this the national government granted an exploration permit to a mining company, with Gadiano as mayor of Sablayan refusing to accept the firm's occupation fee. The firm filed a case in a local court in response to Gadiano's resistance.

Governor of Occidental Mindoro
Gadiano would be elected as Governor of Occidental Mindoro in 2019, under the Pederalismo ng Dugong Dakilang Samahan (PDDS) National Political Party.

As Occidental Mindoro governor, Gadiano has reached out to the national government to intervene in the dispute between power distributor Occidental Mindoro Electric Cooperative Inc. (Omeco) and power supplier Occidental Mindoro Consolidated Power Corp. (OMCPC) to help resolve the electricity situation in the province.

In 2022 elections, he supported the candidacy of Bongbong Marcos who was eventually elected as President of the Philippines.

Personal life
Gadiano is married to Susan Infante He is an Ilocano.

External links

References

Living people
People from Occidental Mindoro
Governors of Occidental Mindoro
Mayors of places in Occidental Mindoro
Democratic Party of the Philippines politicians
1963 births
Ilocano people